The 2000 Big 12 Conference baseball tournament was held at AT&T Bricktown Ballpark in Oklahoma City, OK from May 17 through 21.  Nebraska won their second of three consecutive tournaments and earned the Big 12 Conference's automatic bid to the 2000 NCAA Division I baseball tournament. This was the second year the conference used the format of the College World Series, with two 4-team double-elimination brackets and a final championship game.

Regular Season Standings
Source:

Colorado did not sponsor a baseball team.

Tournament

Iowa State, Kansas, and Kansas State did not make the tournament.

All-Tournament team

See also
College World Series
NCAA Division I Baseball Championship
Big 12 Conference baseball tournament

References

Big 12 Tourney media guide 
Boydsworld 2000 Standings

Tournament
Big 12 Conference Baseball Tournament
Big 12 Conference baseball tournament
Big 12 Conference baseball tournament
Baseball competitions in Oklahoma City
College sports tournaments in Oklahoma